Russ Walker (born May 24, 1953) is a Canadian former professional ice hockey right winger. He played 3 seasons in the World Hockey Association for the Cleveland Crusaders between 1973 and 1976 and 17 games in the National Hockey League for the Los Angeles Kings between 1976 and 1977.

Career statistics

Regular season and playoffs

External links
 

1953 births
Living people
Canadian ice hockey right wingers
Cleveland Crusaders draft picks
Cleveland Crusaders players
Fort Worth Texans players
Los Angeles Kings draft picks
Los Angeles Kings players
Ice hockey people from Alberta
Lethbridge Sugar Kings players
Red Deer Rustlers players
Saskatoon Blades players
Sportspeople from Red Deer, Alberta
Springfield Indians players